Alan Thompson (born 20 November 1951) is a former Australian rules footballer who played for the Fitzroy Football Club in the Victorian Football League (VFL).

Notes

External links 

Living people
1951 births
Australian rules footballers from Victoria (Australia)
Fitzroy Football Club players
South Warrnambool Football Club players